Oliver Wähling (born 6 September 1999) is a German professional footballer who plays as a midfielder for 3. Liga side VfL Osnabrück.

Club career
In June 2021, Wähling joined 3. Liga side VfL Osnabrück on a free transfer from Mainz 05 II, having spent the previous three seasons playing in Regionalliga. On 15 January 2022, Wähling made his professional league debut for VfL Osnabrück as a late substitute in a 2–1 victory over Saarbrücken.

References

External links

1999 births
Living people
People from Ludwigsburg
Sportspeople from Stuttgart (region)
German footballers
Footballers from Baden-Württemberg
Association football midfielders
3. Liga players
Regionalliga players
Karlsruher SC players
VfB Stuttgart II players
1. FSV Mainz 05 II players
VfL Osnabrück players